The 1951 Brown Bears football team represented Brown University during the 1951 college football season.

In their first season under head coach Alva Kelley, the Bears compiled a 2–7 record, and were outscored 222 to 124. J.A. Martland and J.J. Pietro were the team captains.  

Brown played its home games at Brown Stadium in Providence, Rhode Island.

Schedule

References

Brown
Brown Bears football seasons
Brown Bears football